Unadilla is a city in Dooly County, Georgia, United States. The population was 3,796 at the 2010 census, up from 2,772 in 2000. Dooly State Prison is located in the northeast corner of the city.

History
Unadilla is a name derived from the Iroquois language meaning "council place". The Georgia General Assembly incorporated Unadilla as a town in 1891.

Geography

U.S. Route 41 passes through the center of town as Pine Street, leading north  to Perry and south  to Vienna, the Dooly County seat. Interstate 75 passes through the west side of Unadilla, with access from Exits 121 and 122. I-75 leads north  to Macon and south  to Tifton. Georgia State Route 230 passes through Unadilla as Second Street and Borum Street, leading southwest  to Byromville and east  to Hawkinsville.

Demographics

2020 census

As of the 2020 United States census, there were 3,118 people, 938 households, and 573 families residing in the city.

2000 census
, there were 2,772 people, 655 households, and 434 families residing in the city. The racial makeup of the city was 34.52% White, 62.12% African American, 0.22% Native American, 0.54% Asian, 1.66% from other races, and 0.94% from two or more races. Hispanic or Latino of any race were 2.99% of the population.

There were 655 households, out of which 32.5% had children under the age of 18 living with them, 33.0% were married couples living together, 27.3% had a female householder with no husband present, and 33.6% were non-families. 29.2% of all households were made up of individuals, and 11.9% had someone living alone who was 65 years of age or older. The average household size was 2.49 and the average family size was 3.07.

In the city, the population was spread out, with 17.6% under the age of 18, 11.8% from 18 to 24, 41.4% from 25 to 44, 20.9% from 45 to 64, and 8.4% who were 65 years of age or older. The median age was 36 years. For every 100 females, there were 202.3 males. For every 100 females age 18 and over, there were 239.9 males.

The median income for a household in the city was $22,250, and the median income for a family was $24,779. Males had a median income of $24,076 versus $17,614 for females. The per capita income for the city was $8,897. About 25.4% of families and 30.4% of the population were below the poverty line, including 44.9% of those under age 18 and 30.4% of those age 65 or over.

Notable people
 David Ragan, Monster Energy NASCAR Cup Series driver of the No. 38 Ford Fusion
 Ken Ragan, former NASCAR and ARCA driver.
 Myron Mixon, 5-time World BBQ champion and Mayor.

References

External links
 Unadilla at Georgia.gov

Cities in Georgia (U.S. state)
Cities in Dooly County, Georgia